Blattman is a surname. Notable people with the surname include:

 Chris Blattman (born 1974), American economist and political scientist
 Fabian Blattman (born 1958), Australian Paralympic athlete

See also
 Blattmann